Honor of the Mounted may refer to:
 The Honor of the Mounted, a 1914 American silent short drama film
 Honor of the Mounted (1932 film), an American pre-Code Western film